Mario Joseph Cariello (January 23, 1907 – August 9, 1985) was an Italian-American lawyer, Democratic politician and judge from Queens, New York City.

Life
Cariello was born on January 23, 1907, in Manhattan, New York City, but lived most of his life in Queens. He was a 1924 graduate of Newtown High School in Elmhurst. He graduated from New York Law School in 1930, and practiced law in New York City.

Cariello was a member of the New York State Assembly (Queens Co., 1st D.) in 1936, 1937, 1938, 1939–40 and 1941. He resigned his seat on September 25, 1941.

He was a Judge of the Municipal Court (Queens) from 1941 to 1962. On January 2, 1963, he was appointed as Borough president of Queens, to fill the vacancy caused by the resignation of John T. Clancy. Cariello won a special election later that year to remain in office for the remainder of the term, and was re-elected to another term in 1965.

Cariello stepped down from the Borough President office when he successfully ran for a seat on the New York Supreme Court in 1968. He was succeeded by his deputy Borough President, Sidney Leviss.

Cariello sat on the Supreme Court until 1977. He died from cancer in 1985 and is entombed at Calvary Cemetery in Woodside, Queens.

References 

1907 births
1985 deaths
People from Queens, New York
New York Law School alumni
New York (state) Democrats
New York Supreme Court Justices
Queens borough presidents
20th-century American judges